= Washington Center (Portland, Oregon) =

Building complex in the United States

- Interactive map of the Washington Center area

General information
- Location: Portland, Oregon, United States
- Coordinates: 45.5203°N 122.6761°W

Washington Center is a commercial property in Portland, Oregon. Built in the 1970s, the 30,000 square-foot development is located on Washington Street between Fourth and Fifth Avenues in downtown Portland. Menashe Properties purchased the development for $9 million in 2014.
